Kotomi Misawa (born 28 July 1996), popularly known as KOTOMI is a Japanese kickboxer, currently signed with K-1, where she is the Krush Women's Flyweight champion.

As of November 2020, she is ranked the #8 pound for pound female kickboxer in the world, according to Combat Press.

Kickboxing career

Early career
Kotomi made her KHAOS debut during KHAOS 4, with a TKO win over Texas Ayumi. She won her next fight against RINA by unanimous decision. In her next fight, Kotomi fought Chin Long Wang during Krush 94. She won the fight by decision.

Kotomi then fought Josefine Lindgren Knutsson during Krush 104. Knutsson won the fight by unanimous decision. In her next fight, she fought Yau Pui Yu, and likewise lost the fight by decision.

She made her K-1 debut against Mahiro, during K-1 World GP 2019 Japan. Kotomi won the fight by unanimous decision. Kotomi was scheduled to fight NA☆NA during Krush 113. She won the fight by unanimous decision.

Kotomi's highest profile matchup came during K-1 World GP 2020 in Fukuoka, when she was scheduled to fight Kana Morimoto. She won the fight by majority decision, which was considered a massive upset.

Krush Flyweight title reign
She took part in the Krush flyweight tournament, which was held during Krush 121. Kotomi faced Yoshimi in the tournament semifinals. She won the fight by unanimous decision. Advancing to the tournament finals, she was scheduled to fight Mahiro at Krush 124. The fight was a rematch, with Kotomi having won their first bout by unanimous decision. Kotomi won the fight by unanimous decision. During the post-match press conference, Kotomi announced her desire to fight a rematch with Kana Morimoto, for the K-1 Flyweight title.

Kotomi was scheduled to face Rikako Sakurai in a 53kg catchweight bout at K-1 World GP 2021: Yokohamatsuri on September 20, 2021. She won the fight by unanimous decision, with all three judges scoring the fight 30-28 in her favor.

Kotomi was scheduled to challenge the K-1 Women's Flyweight champion Kana Morimoto at K-1 World GP 2022 Japan on February 27, 2022. The two of them previously fought on November 3, 2020, with Kotomi winning by unanimous decision. Kotomi later withdrew from the bout, for undisclosed reasons, and was replace by Ran.

Championships and accomplishments

Kickboxing
K-1
K-1 Women's Amateur B Class Tournament (-50kg)
Krush Flyweight (-50kg) Championship

Awards
Combat Press
2020 "Female Fighter of the Year" nominee

Fight record

|-
|-  style="text-align:center; background:#cfc"
| 2021-09-20 || Win ||align=left| Rikako Sakurai || K-1 World GP 2021: Yokohamatsuri || Yokohama, Japan || Decision (Unanimous) || 3 || 3:00

|- style="background:#cfc"
| 2021-04-23|| Win ||align=left| Mahiro ||  Krush 124, Tournament Final || Tokyo, Japan || Decision (Unanimous) || 3 ||  3:00
|-
! style=background:white colspan=9 |
|- style="background:#cfc"
| 2021-01-23|| Win ||align=left| Yoshimi ||  Krush 121, Tournament Semifinal || Tokyo, Japan || Decision (Unanimous) || 3 ||  3:00
|- style="background:#cfc"
| 2020-11-03|| Win ||align=left| Kana Morimoto ||  K-1 World GP 2020 in Fukuoka || Fukuoka, Japan ||  Decision (Unanimous) || 3 || 3:00
|- style="background:#cfc"
| 2020-06-28 || Win ||align=left| NA☆NA ||  Krush 113 || Tokyo, Japan ||  Decision (Unanimous)  || 3 || 3:00
|- style="background:#cfc"
| 2019-12-28 || Win ||align=left| Mahiro || K-1 World GP 2019 Japan: ～Women's Flyweight Championship Tournament～ || Nagoya, Japan ||  Decision (Unanimous)  || 3 || 3:00
|- style="background:#fbb"
| 2019-11-02 || Loss ||align=left| Yau Pui Yu || KF1 Fight 32 || Hong Kong ||  Decision (Unanimous)  || 3 || 3:00
|- style="background:#fbb"
| 2019-08-31 || Loss ||align=left| Josefine Lindgren Knutsson || Krush 104 || Tokyo, Japan ||  Decision (Unanimous)  || 3 || 3:00
|- style="background:#cfc"
| 2018-10-28  || Win ||align=left| Chin Long Wang || Krush 94 || Tokyo, Japan ||  Decision (Unanimous)  || 3 || 3:00
|- style="background:#cfc"
| 2018-05-26 || Win ||align=left| RINA || KHAOS 5 || Tokyo, Japan ||  Decision (Unanimous)  || 3 || 3:00
|- style="background:#cfc"
| 2017-10-14 || Win ||align=left| Texas Ayumi || KHAOS 4 || Tokyo, Japan || TKO (Referee stoppage) || 3 || 0:32 
|-
| colspan=9 | Legend:

See also
List of female kickboxers

References

Japanese female kickboxers
1996 births
Living people
People from Shibuya
Sportspeople from Tokyo